Stefan Amzoll (21 October 1943 – 23 October 2019) was a German musicologist, journalist and independent author. In 1989/1990 he was editor-in-chief of Radio DDR 2 and 1990/91 deputy editor-in-chief of Deutschlandsender Culture. A main focus of his work was New Music.

Life 
Amzoll was born in Sztum and grew up in the GDR. From 1968 to 1972 he studied musicology and theatre studies at the Humboldt University Berlin. From the mid-1970s he also published articles in the association journal Musik und Gesellschaft. In 1987/88, now a music editor, he was awarded a Dr. phil. at the Faculty of Social Sciences of the Scientific Council of the Humboldt University of Berlin with the thesis Music in the Radio of the Weimar Republic – Studies on the History of the Origin of Media-Specific Art Production and Mediation. The reviewers of the thesis were Günter Mayer, Gerd Rienäcker and Dieter Boeck. Amzoll was one of those researchers in the GDR who was open-minded about New Music.

In 1977, he began his journalistic career as an editor for the second program of the Rundfunk der DDR (Radio DDR 2). On 1 May 1978 he was awarded the order Banner of Labor in stage II as a member of the journalistic "Collective". From 1979 to December 1989 he was head of the editorial office  at Radio DDR 2. There he initiated the program "Radio DDR-Musikklub", which was focused on contemporary music. He also designed composer portraits of Georg Katzer, Friedrich Goldmann and Reiner Bredemeyer among others. From December 1989 to June 1990, Amzoll worked as Chief editor of Radio DDR 2. The administrative scientist Susanne Hepperle of the Saarländischer Rundfunk retrospectively described Amzoll as a former "functionary in the SED basic organization of the GDR Broadcasting Corporation".

After the reunification he was provisionally taken over by the new  as one of few co-workers. From June 1990 he worked as deputy editor-in-chiefunder the direction of Monika Künzel, until he was "suspended" from service at the end of 1991 by the Broadcasting Commissioner of the newly-formed German states  and the ZDF director . The journalist Otto Köhler (1993) found little sympathy for this in a guest article in Die Zeit, since DS Kultur was "above all his [Amzoll's] work" and the music editor "has gotten himself into a lot of trouble with the SED and much admiration from expert colleagues in the West for his program initiatives".

Since 1992 Amzoll has worked as a freelance author. Contributions and interviews have been published in specialist journals for new music (Neue Zeitschrift für Musik, Neue Musikzeitung among others) and the theatre magazine Theater der Zeit as well as the literary magazine . Biographical articles appeared in the music encyclopedias Komponisten der Gegenwart and Die Musik in Geschichte und Gegenwart. In addition, he published in the theory journal UTOPIE kreativ as well as in national daily and weekly newspapers (der Freitag and Neues Deutschland among others). Since the beginning of the 1990s, he has been writing for the feature pages of Junge Welt. Recent radio reports have been published by Deutschlandradio Kultur; for the Deutschlandfunk he designed specialist programs such as "Atelier neuer Musik".

Amzoll died in 2019 at the age of 76 in Uckerland.

Radio plays 
 1973: with Ursula Auschner: Musik in der Funkdramatik. Eine Sendung mit dem Komponisten Tilo Medek (Rundfunk der DDR)
 1996: Warum haben Sie niemals Stalin angeklagt? – Regie:  (Rundfunk der DDR)
 1996: Ich bin das Auge. Radio-Szenario about Dziga Vertov – Regie:  (Deutschlandradio)
 2003: Putze Polina – Regie: Wolfgang Rindfleisch (Deutschlandradio)

Writings 
 (ed.): Landschaft "für" Schenker. edition refugium, Berlin 2003, .
 (ed.): Landschaft für Katzer. Akademie der Künste, Berlin 2005, .
 with Annette Tietz (ed.): Utopia – . Galerie Pankow, Berlin 2015.

References

External links 
 
 Literatur von Stefan Amzoll in the Bibliography of Music Literature
 

German musicologists
Music journalists
German radio writers
German radio journalists
German opinion journalists
1943 births
2019 deaths